A railway system existed in Mauritius from the 1860s until 1964. In 1956 the decision was made to close the railway due to unprofitability. Freight transport continued until 1964 when the railway was scrapped.

From 1964 to 2020, there were no operational long-distance railways in Mauritius. With increasing road traffic congestion, plans surfaced in 2009 for a metro system. The first stage opened in 2020.

Map 
 UN Map

Light rail system

Initial plans suggested a 24.9 km line which would relieve pressure on busy roads; it would be supported by a feeder network of buses.

The first line would go from the capital at Port Louis to Curepipe, mostly following the trackbed of a former Government railway closed in the 1960s.

On 2 August 2017 it was announced that Larsen & Toubro would be the contractor responsible for constructing the metro network.

The first stage, Port Louis to Rose Hill Central, was opened on 10 January 2020. An extension by two stops to Quatre Bornes was opened on 20 June 2021. The second stage, to Curepipe, and the third stage, to Réduit, are scheduled to be completed by the end of 2022.

See also

Economy of Mauritius
 History of rail transport in Mauritius
Railway stations in Mauritius
Transport in Mauritius

References

Notes

Further reading

External links